is a former Nippon Professional Baseball infielder and current manager of the Tohoku Rakuten Golden Eagles. In 2019, Miki led the Eagles' farm team to the Eastern League title for the first time in its 15-year history. He was then promoted to manager of the Eagles for the 2020 season with an emphasis on rebuilding the team. After one season it was announced that Miki would again return to manage the farm team.

References

External links
Career statistics and player information from Baseball-Reference or NPB (in Japanese)

1977 births
Living people
Baseball people from Osaka
Japanese baseball players
Nippon Professional Baseball infielders
Yakult Swallows players
Tokyo Yakult Swallows players
Hokkaido Nippon-Ham Fighters players
Managers of baseball teams in Japan
Tohoku Rakuten Golden Eagles managers